is a Japanese short-track speed skater, who won a bronze medal in the 5000 m relay at the 1992 Winter Olympics together with teammates Yuichi Akasaka, Tatsuyoshi Ishihara and Tsutomu Kawasaki. Before 1992, he won two gold medals in the World Short Track Speed Skating Championships, 1985 and 1987.

He is currently working at the University of Tsukuba.

External links
 
 

1967 births
Living people
Japanese male short track speed skaters
Olympic short track speed skaters of Japan
Olympic medalists in short track speed skating
Olympic bronze medalists for Japan
Short track speed skaters at the 1988 Winter Olympics
Short track speed skaters at the 1992 Winter Olympics
Medalists at the 1992 Winter Olympics
Asian Games medalists in short track speed skating
Asian Games gold medalists for Japan
Asian Games silver medalists for Japan
Short track speed skaters at the 1986 Asian Winter Games
Medalists at the 1986 Asian Winter Games
Universiade medalists in short track speed skating
Sportspeople from Nagoya
University of Tsukuba alumni
Academic staff of the University of Tsukuba
Universiade bronze medalists for Japan
Competitors at the 1991 Winter Universiade
20th-century Japanese people